North Bellmore is a census-designated place (CDP) in the Town of Hempstead in Nassau County, on Long Island, in New York, United States. The population was 19,941 at the 2010 census.

North Bellmore, along with Bellmore, are referred to collectively as "The Bellmores". Also, the part of the latter area south of Merrick Road (or possibly south of Sunrise Highway) is sometimes called "South Bellmore". Both serve as suburbs of New York.

Demographics
As of the census of 2010, there were 19,949 people, 6,365 households, and 5,407 families residing within the CDP. The population density was 7,696.6 per square mile (2,970.3/km2). There were 6,818 housing units at an average density of 2,542.9/sq mi (981.4/km2). The racial makeup of the CDP was 88.5% White, 2.6% African American, 0.1% Native American, 5.6% Asian, 0% Pacific Islander, 1.55% from other races, and 1.7% from two or more races. Hispanic or Latino of any race were 7.72% of the population.

There were 6,555 households, out of which 39.0% had children under the age of 18 living with them, 68.9% were married couples living together, 10.7% had a female householder with no husband present, and 18.7% were non-families. 16.2% of all households were made up of individuals, and 8.2% had someone living alone who was 65 years of age or older. The average household size was 3.08 and the average family size was 3.46. Median value of owner-occupied housing units 2007-2011 was $451,900.

The age of the population varies with 29.1% under the age of 18, 6.5% from 18 to 24, 29.8% from 25 to 44, 23.6% from 45 to 64, and 14.3% who were 65 years of age or older. The median age was 39 years. For every 100 females, there were 94.4 males. For every 100 females age 18 and over, there were 91.1 males.

The median income for a household in the CDP was $102,973, and the median income for a family was $113,521. Males had a median income of $60,832 versus $32,106 for females. The per capita income for the CDP was $38,314. About 1.6% of families and 4.6% of the population were below the poverty line, including 2.6% of those under age 18 and 4.2% of those age 65 or over.

Emergency services 
North Bellmore is served by the North Bellmore Fire Department and the Nassau County Police Department.

Notable residents
Lenny Bruce, progressive comedian. 
Paul S. Katz, graduate of Mepham High School, public intellectual and renowned neuroscientist.  Noted as the scourge to Georgia intelligent-design advocates.
Tatyana Marisol Ali, graduate of Saw Mill Road School and Harvard; actor and singer. in the televised show Fresh Prince of Bel-Air. Was in the creative arts program. 
Amos Zereoue, graduate of Mepham High School, New England Patriots running back.
Eric Chester

References

External links 

 The Chamber of Commerce of the Bellmores official website

Hempstead, New York
Census-designated places in New York (state)
Hamlets in New York (state)
Census-designated places in Nassau County, New York
Hamlets in Nassau County, New York
Populated coastal places in New York (state)